Woyzeck is a stage play written by Georg Büchner. Büchner wrote the play between July and October 1836, yet left it incomplete at his death in February 1837. The play first appeared in 1877 in a heavily edited version by Karl Emil Franzos, and was first performed at the Residence Theatre in Munich on 8 November 1913. 

Since then, Woyzeck has become one of the most influential and most often-performed German plays. Due to its unfinished nature, the play has inspired many diverging adaptations.

Composition and textual history
Büchner probably began writing the play between June and September 1836. It is loosely based on the true story of Johann Christian Woyzeck, a Leipzig wigmaker who later became a soldier. In 1821, Woyzeck, in a fit of jealousy, murdered Christiane Woost, a 46-year-old widow with whom he had been living; he was later publicly beheaded. Büchner's work remained in a fragmentary state at the time of his early death in 1837.

The play was first made public in a heavily edited and augmented version by Karl Emil Franzos, who published it in periodicals in 1875 and 1877, before including it in his edition of Büchner's collected works in 1879. Franzos mistakenly understood the title character's name in the manuscripts as "Wozzeck"; the play bore that title in its first stage productions, and in subsequent published editions based on Franzos' version. The play was not performed until November 8, 1913 at the Residenztheater, Munich, where it was produced by Max Reinhardt.

Not only did Franzos have to cope with Büchner's "microscopically small" handwriting, but the pages had faded so badly that they had to be chemically treated to make the text decipherable at all. Franzos was unaware of the real-life basis of the drama. The play was first generally disseminated in 1921 through the appearance of a new edition, edited by Georg Witkowski, which introduced the corrected title Woyzeck.

Plot summary
Franz Woyzeck, a lonely soldier stationed in a provincial German town, is living with Marie, the mother of his child who is not blessed by the church as the child was born out of wedlock. Woyzeck earns extra money for his family by performing menial jobs for the Captain and agreeing to take part in medical experiments conducted by the Doctor. At one of these experiments, the Doctor tells Woyzeck that he must eat nothing but peas. Woyzeck's mental health is breaking down and he begins to experience a series of apocalyptic visions. Meanwhile, Marie grows tired of Woyzeck and turns her attentions to a handsome drum major who, in an ambiguous scene taking place in Marie's bedroom, sleeps with her.

With his jealous suspicions growing, Woyzeck confronts the drum major, who beats Woyzeck up and humiliates him. Finally, Woyzeck stabs Marie to death by a pond. While a third act trial is claimed by some, notably A. H. J. Knight and Fritz Bergemann, to have been part of the original conception (what may be the beginning of a courtroom scene survives), the fragment, as left by Büchner, ends with Woyzeck disposing of the knife in the pond while trying to clean himself of the blood.

Here Franzos inserted the stage direction "ertrinkt" (he drowns), and although this emendation according to Knight "almost amounts to a forgery", most versions employ drowning as an appropriate resolution to the story.

Notable productions
Since the original play was unfinished, many productions have taken liberties with the play's dialogue and scene order. Notable productions include:
 a 1913 first production at residenztheater, Munich, produced by Max Reinhardt
 a 1969 stage adaptation at Dramaten in Stockholm directed by Ingmar Bergman starring Thommy Berggren. The translation Bergman used was by Per Erik Wahlund, and in 1970 the translation was published by Sällskapet Bokvännerna, in Stockholm, with 24 woodcuts by the Swedish artist Torsten Billman.
 In the 1975 staging by the Classic Stage Company starring Ron Perlman, Christopher Martin "stressed the luidity of the play's movement, and its sullen realism" according to Clive Barnes.
 a 1990 stage adaptation at Hartford Stage directed by Richard Foreman starring David Patrick Kelly
 a 1997 stage version by Keith Fowler.  Fowler prepared his own translation for the Woyzeck he directed at the University of California, Irvine.  In considering the traditional arrangements of scenes — whether to start with the scene in which Woyzeck is shaving his captain, the doctor's lecture, or when Woyzeck is in the woods and hears voices below the ground; and whether to end with Woyzeck's trial or his drowning — Fowler notes how each arrangement makes a different thematic statement, viz.:
 Start: Shaving / End: Trial / Statement: Oppression of the lower classes by those in power.
 Start: Woods / End: Drowning / Statement: Deranged Woyzeck destroys himself.
 Start: Lecture / End: Drowning / Statement: Society disregards Woyzeck's humanity, eventually discards him...
 Start: Lecture / End: Trial / Statement: ...or judges him.
 But, as Fowler also comments, what truly counts is "the totality of Büchner's world, for however the scenes are arranged, we will still have what G. Wilson Knight calls the ‘burning core’ of the drama....”
 production of the play by Vesturport, an Iceland-based theatre company, directed by Gísli Örn Garðarsson.
 A November 2002 Cape Cod Community College production, adapted and directed by Victor Warren
 a 2007 production at the Carnegie Mellon University School of Drama, Woyzeck was re-worked by Director Dan Rigazzi to take place in 1951 and reflect themes of racial pressure in the army. Also, with the help of the Carnegie Mellon University German Language Department, pieces of the original Clarus Report were translated to English and incorporated in the text and structure of the production.
 A play in 2009 at the Malthouse Theatre, Melbourne, Australia. Director Michael Kantor with Music by Nick Cave & Warren Ellis
 Production of the play by Toto Funds the Arts and Rafiki; adapted and directed by Anmol Vellani (India)
 a modernized version of Woyzeck played by the Belgian theatre group 'NTGent' and 'Toneelgroep Ceremonia' in fall 2010. The director, Eric De Volder, died the night after the première.
 Woyzeck, a 2010 Cameri Theater Tel-Aviv production, translated into Hebrew by Dori Parnas, edited and directed by Itay Tiran, who also stars as Woyzeck. Tiran's version sets the action in a psychiatric hospital and features Hebrew translations of songs by Tom Waits.
 A 2012 re-translation by Campbell Babson and directed by Ben Roberts took place at The Headwaters Theatre in Portland, Oregon.
 Woyzeck, a free adaptation by Neil LaBute that premiered at the Virginia Tech School of Performing Arts and Cinema on November 1, 2012 and ran through November 11, 2012. The adaptation was directed by 3-time OBIE winner Bob McGrath.
 A 2014 adaptation by Dylan Gamblin performed by Ghostlight Theater Company of New England in collaboration with die Karneval von Wahnsinn.
 An adaptation of the play set in 1980s Berlin, adapted by Jack Thorne, played at the Old Vic Theatre in 2017. It starred John Boyega as Woyzeck.
 In 2018 playwright Leo Butler's adaptation, according to The Stage newspaper, "preserves the absurd logic of the original amidst uber-contemporary references to drone strikes, automation, data privacy and fast food chains".  It was directed by Roxana Silbert for the Birmingham Repertory Theatre, with a 100-strong cast.
 A 2018 adaptation by renowned ensemble physical theatre company Spies Like Us debuted at The Pleasance on August 1. The production was praised for its "contemporary intensity", and featured just five actors, five buckets and a crate.

Adaptations
The many adaptations of Woyzeck include:
 Wozzeck, an opera by Alban Berg, completed 1922, premiered in Berlin in December 1925.
 Wozzeck, an opera by Manfred Gurlitt, premiered in Bremen in April 1926.
 Wozzeck, a 1947 film by Georg C. Klaren
 World of Woyzeck, a 1959 stage adaption by John Herbert
 Woyzeck, a 1966 TV film directed by Rudolf Noelte.
 Postman, a 1972 film by Dariush Mehrjui
 Woyzeck, a 1979 film by Werner Herzog
 Wodzeck, a 1984 film by Oliver Herbrich
 Woyzeck's Head, a 1991 novel by Ekbert Faas
 Woyzeck, a 1994 film by János Szász
 W – Workers' Circus, a play of Árpád Schilling's Krétakör incorporating poetry by Attila József
 Woyzeck, a 2010 film by Francis Annan, the first English-language feature-length movie adaptation. This was filmed at, and used students from, Xaverian College.
 Woyzeck, a musical conceived by Robert Wilson, with lyrics and music by Tom Waits and Kathleen Brennan; the songs from which are on Waits's Blood Money album
 Tom Waits has a song on his album Orphans: Brawlers, Bawlers & Bastards, entitled "Children's Story", which is based on Woyzeck
 Re: Woyzeck, a modernized play by Jeremy Gable (in which Georg Büchner becomes a character in his own play)
 Skin, a play by Naomi Iizuka
  Woyzeck on the Highveld, a puppet theater version by South African-based Handspring Puppet Company, directed by William Kentridge
 Woyzeck, a play by Splendid Productions which performs the scenes as they were found, rather than chronologically
 Woyzeck, from Georg Büchner, a 2011 play by three Portuguese young actors, António Mortágua, Catarina Rosa and Vera Barreto. The text was followed precisely through a scenic arrangement where the audience is facing a door, Woyzeck "António Mortágua" is sitting in a sofa with his back to the door and the other two actors play from the street. It was played in a small theater room in Lisbon, from March 30 to April 17 with very intimate small audience sessions of ten people at a time.
 After a successful black box production, it was accepted to perform at the Philadelphia Fringe festival in late August to early September in 2011. The adaptation was performed by students from Muhlenberg College. Directed by Zach Trebino, an alumn from Muhlenberg.
 Woyzeck Musical Deathmetal, a musical theatre adaptation by Christopher Carter Sanderson at Norway's EFTN. The adaptation was produced at KRT in workshop form, November 2011 for three performances, with lighting design by Ryan Hauenstein, costumes, Mary Anne Davis, and with Max Schneller in the role of Woyzeck. The adaptation in this format was performed at the Times Square International Theater Festival, in January 2012.
 Waseem, a Hindi adaptation, written and directed by Sharmistha Saha, Research Scholar at the Free University of Berlin, was performed by the students of the Jawaharlal Nehru University Drama Club and Wings Cultural Society on January 21 and 22, 2012 at the School of Arts and Aesthetics, JNU, New Delhi.
 The Woyzeck, an adaptation and translation by Sebastian Rex, which ran at the New Diorama Theatre, London in October 2012, produced by Rex's company Acting Like Mad. Theatrical Niche Ltd and Acting Like Mad co-produced a subsequent Regional and Greater London Tour of The Woyzeck in early Spring 2013. A text version is available from PlayDead Press – The Woyzeck / Spare, translation and adaptation by Sebastian Rex (PlayDead Press, 2012)
 The Drowned Man: A Hollywood Fable, a production by Punchdrunk based on Woyzeck but set in a 1960s film studio. The production ran from 20 June 2013 – 6 July 2014.
 Master of the Universe, a 2014 adaption produced by The Living Room Theatre in Kansas City Missouri. Written and directed by Kyle Hatley.
 Woyzeck - The Film, an award-winning short film that uses the original dialogue only. The experimental adaption was directed by Minona von Vietinghoff in 2012.
Wendell, a contemporary riff on Woyzeck. Set in modern-day suburbia, Wendell re-imagines Woyzeck through the perspective of Woyzeck and Marie's child, now a teenager. This play is adapted by John Moletress and was first performed at McDaniel College. http://www.carrollcountytimes.com/news/local/ph-cc-wendell-20150414,0,7255954.story
 Woyzeck Masalı ("The Tale of Woyzeck"), a 2015 rock musical adaptation produced by Tatbikat Sahnesi in Ankara, Turkey. Adapted and directed by Erdal Beşikçioğlu.
 Woyzeck, Inc., a translation and adaption by Thomas Wolber and Logan Kovach, premiered at Ohio Wesleyan University in March 2021. The adaptation took the source material of the play and transported it to a distribution center owned by the fictional company Primedia, in a vocal criticism of Amazon. A recording of the performance is available at owu.edu/woyzeck-inc.

The title character in Benjamin Hale's novel The Evolution of Bruno Littlemore, a chimpanzee, stages the play at the research center to which he is confined.

References

External links
 

1836 plays
Plays by Georg Büchner
Plays set in Germany
Unfinished plays
German plays adapted into films
Plays adapted into operas